WBKN (92.1 FM, "B92 Country") is an American radio station broadcasting a country music format. Licensed to Brookhaven, Mississippi, the station is currently features programming from Citadel Media and Dial Global. The station is owned by North Shore Broadcasting Co., Inc.

On September 21, 2011, Charles W. Dowdy, acting as the sole owner of license holder Brookhaven Broadcasting, Inc., dissolved the corporation and assigned the broadcast licenses it held (WMJU and WBKN) to himself acting as debtor in possession before initiating a Chapter 11 bankruptcy. The FCC approved the license transfer on December 19, 2011.

On October 25, 2019, the station's license was transferred to North Shore Broadcasting Co., Inc.

References

External links
B 92 The Boss Facebook

BKN
Country radio stations in the United States
Radio stations established in 1976
1976 establishments in Mississippi